The Jewel Box (also known as the St. Louis Floral Conservatory and the City of St. Louis Floral Display House) is a greenhouse located in Forest Park, St. Louis, Missouri. It now serves as a public horticultural facility and is listed on the National Register of Historic Places (NRHP).

It was designed by architect William C. E. Becker and built in 1936 by the Robert Paulus Construction Company. It consists of five stepped, composition-covered wood roofs with clerestories, rather than a regular glass roof, in order to prevent damage from frequent hailstorms.

History
In 1913, Nelson Cunliff became Commissioner of Parks and Recreation for St. Louis City. Due to high levels of smoke and soot within the city, he began a survey to determine which plants could survive the conditions. He later asked John Moritz, who was in charge of the city's greenhouses, to set up a display greenhouse to showcase various plants which could survive. It is said that someone called the displays "like a jewel box", hence the name. In 1933, Bernard Dickmann became Mayor of St. Louis and decided to build a new facility. The building cost $125,000 and William C. E. Becker, then Chief Engineer of Bridges and Buildings for the city, was assigned to design the building. Construction began on December 12, 1935 and the facility opened on November 14, 1936.

In 2002, a $3.5 million year-long renovation of the building was completed.

Construction
Most of the glass is framed by copper with a verdigris patina. The Jewel Box is supported by eight fixed arches, which carry the structure's weight. There are also triangular trusses between every other arch. The ceiling is composed of wood planking. The Jewel Box's entrance is a vestibule made of limestone. Inside the greenhouse, there is a concrete-floored balcony located across the south end. A reflecting pool lies in front of the Jewel Box's entrance.

See also
 1939 St. Louis smog
 Climatron, a large geodesic dome greenhouse begun in the late 1950s in St. Louis, at the Missouri Botanical Garden

References

External links
 Official Site

Buildings and structures completed in 1936
Agricultural buildings and structures on the National Register of Historic Places in Missouri
Buildings and structures in St. Louis
Art Deco architecture in Missouri
Forest Park (St. Louis)
Greenhouses in the United States
Tourist attractions in St. Louis
Agricultural buildings and structures in Missouri
National Register of Historic Places in St. Louis
1936 establishments in Missouri